Bochahan Assembly constituency is an assembly constituency in Muzaffarpur district in the Indian state of Bihar. It is reserved for scheduled castes. Bochahan Assembly constituency is part of No. 15 Muzaffarpur (Lok Sabha constituency).

Overview
As per Delimitation of Parliamentary and Assembly constituencies Order, 2008, No. 91 Bochahan Assembly constituency (SC) is composed of the following:
Adi Gopalpur, Balthi Rasulpur, Bhootane, Deogan, Karanpur North, Karanpur South, Lohsari, Maidapur, Majhauli, Sahila Rampur, Sarfuddinpur, Unsar and Vishunpur Jagdish gram panchayats of Bochahan community development block; Abdul Nagar Urf Madhopur, Baikatpur, Barajagannath, Bhikhanpur, Chhapra Megh, Dumri, Jamalabad,
Jhapahan, Kanauli Vishundutta, Khabra, Manika Harikesh, Manika
Vishunpur Chand, Mushahri Alias Radha Nagar, Narauli, Prahladpur,
Rajwara Bhagwan, Rohua, Sahbazpur, Shekhpur, Sherpur, Susta and
Taraura Gopalpur gram panchayats of Mushahri CD Block.

Members of Legislative Assembly
^-bypoll

Election results
from 1957 to 1962 this constituency was known as muzzafarnagar muffasil (constituency number 63).
Contests in most years were multi cornered but only winners and runners up are being mentioned. Ramai Ram representing RJD defeated Shiv Nath Chaudhary of JD(U) in October 2005 and February 2005, and Musafir Paswan representing JD(U) in 2000. Ramai Ram of JD defeated Musafir Paswan representing SAP in 1995 and Ram Pratap Niraj of Congress in 1990. Ramai Ram of LD defeated Hari Lal Ram of Congress in 1985. Ramai Ram of Janata Party (JP) defeated Righan Ram of CPI in 1980. Kamal Paswan of JP defeated Hari Lal Ram of Congress in 1977.

1967 Assembly Elections

1969 Assembly Elections

1972 Assembly Elections

1977 Assembly Elections

1980 Assembly Elections

1985 Assembly Elections

1990 Assembly Elections

1995 Assembly Elections

2000 Assembly Elections

February 2005 Assembly Elections

October 2005 Assembly Elections

2010 Assembly Elections

2015 Assembly Elections

2020 Assembly Elections

2022

References

External links
 

Assembly constituencies of Bihar
Politics of Muzaffarpur district